Bradina subpurpurescens is a moth in the family Crambidae. It was described by Warren in 1896. It is found in India, where it has been recorded from the Khasi Hills.

References

Moths described in 1896
Bradina